Ivan Mykhailovych Stoiko (born 27 April 1961) is a Ukrainian political activist and politician and former member of the Verkhovna Rada.

In 1982-1997 he worked at various jobs, in Ukraine as well as Komi ASSR.

In 2002–2014 with breaks Stoiko was a member of the Verkhovna Rada representing People's Movement of Ukraine.

In 2005-2007 he served as a Governor of Ternopil Oblast.

References

External links
 Profile at the Official Ukraine Today portal

1961 births
Living people
People from Ternopil Oblast
Syktyvkar State University alumni
Ternopil National Economic University alumni
Governors of Ternopil Oblast
Fourth convocation members of the Verkhovna Rada
Sixth convocation members of the Verkhovna Rada
Seventh convocation members of the Verkhovna Rada
People's Movement of Ukraine politicians
Laureates of the Honorary Diploma of the Verkhovna Rada of Ukraine